Roman Fischer (born 24 March 1983) is a Czech football player who currently plays for FC Zbrojovka Brno on loan from Senica. He was once the club captain of his former team FC Hradec Králové.

References

External links
 
 
 Guardian Football

1983 births
Living people
Czech footballers
Czech Republic youth international footballers
Czech First League players
1. FC Slovácko players
FC Hradec Králové players
MFK Karviná players
FC Zbrojovka Brno players
Association football midfielders
Sportspeople from Ostrava